The Civil Party is a minor political party in Taiwan founded on 7 March 1993. It has no representation in the Legislative Yuan, but won one seat in the National Assembly election of 2005. In the 2008 legislative election it had the following policies in its manifesto: establishing a  Grand Republic of Taiwan, being a federation of seven or ten small constituent republics; developing nuclear weapons; releasing all prisoners except those convicted of grave offences; legalization of euthanasia and prostitution.

References

External links
 Civil Party official website

1993 establishments in Taiwan
Political parties established in 1993
Political parties in Taiwan